Live from Abbey Road is a 12-part, one-hour performance series/documentary that began filming its first season during 2006 at Abbey Road Studios in London. Season 2 was filmed between 2007 and 2008, season 3 was filmed in 2009 and Season 4 was filmed in 2011. The series features a total of 128 musical artists to date (about 32 per Season) -- usually two or three per show, performing up to five songs per session.  The sessions are recorded without a live audience. Filmed in High-Definition with the occasional use of 35 mm lenses, the producers have sought to record performances which "look like a movie and sound like a record".

Broadcast licenses
The series began broadcasting on Channel 4 / More 4 in the United Kingdom in January 2007 under a license from Channel 4. Since season 2 the series has been licensed for broadcast in 27 countries around the world, including:
 ZDF KULTUR (Germany)
 EBS (South Korea)
 Sundance Channel (United States)
 Metro TV (Indonesia)
 TV2 (Malaysia)
 NHK (Japan)
 HOT Family (Israel)
 STAR World (Asia) 
 RÚV (Iceland)
 Creative Networks (Italy)
 Okto (Singapore) 
 Canadian Broadcasting Corporation (Canada)
 Canvas (Belgium)
 Sony Entertainment Television (Latin America)
 IntraCommunications (Russia)
 Kanal 5 (Sweden)
 Dream TV (Turkey) 
 Once TV (Mexico)
 Australian Broadcasting Corporation (Australia)
 Animax (Latin America)

The series is distributed for broadcast by Fremantle Media. The series is licensed to 112 territories in total.

Production

Live from Abbey Road Limited is an independent production company formed by the series' producer, Michael Gleason. The series is produced under a multi year license from EMI, owner of Abbey Road Studios.
The second half of Season 4 aired in the UK from November 2011.

Musicians

The first series features famous musicians and groups from various genres, artists playing Rock music to Heavy metal, music influenced by Electronic music such as Dance and Industrial, Pop and even Jazz and Blues have all been featured. The artists spend the day at Abbey Road rehearsing and performing. Many have their own mixing desk and sound techs on site. The idea is to capture the sound created during the production of a record, and to film the process without an audience, typical of the atmosphere in a recording studio.

Series 1

Snow Patrol, Madeleine Peyroux and Red Hot Chili Peppers
Paul Simon, Corinne Bailey Rae and Primal Scream
Craig David, James Morrison and Dave Matthews
Amos Lee, David Gilmour and Randy Crawford & Joe Sample
The Kooks, Wynton Marsalis and Muse
The Zutons, Shawn Colvin, Nerina Pallot and Ray Lamontagne
Kasabian, Josh Groban and The Good, the Bad & the Queen
Gnarls Barkley, The Feeling and The Killers
Dr. John, LeAnn Rimes and Massive Attack
Jamiroquai, Damien Rice and Goo Goo Dolls
Natasha Bedingfield, Gipsy Kings and Iron Maiden
John Mayer, Richard Ashcroft and Norah Jones

Series 2
The 2nd series was broadcast in the UK between 27 June 2008 and 13 September 2008.
Mary J. Blige, Dashboard Confessional and James Blunt
Sheryl Crow, Hard-Fi and Diana Krall
Stereophonics, Colbie Caillat and Joan Armatrading
Panic! at the Disco, David Gray and Suzanne Vega
The Hoosiers, The Black Keys and Manu Chao
Matchbox Twenty, The Script and Def Leppard
Rascal Flatts, Kate Nash, Herbie Hancock
The Kills, Sara Bareilles and The Fratellis
The Subways, Gnarls Barkley and Herbie Hancock
Elbow, MGMT and Alanis Morissette
Justin Currie, Ben Harper and Bryan Adams
Teddy Thompson, Martha Wainwright and Brian Wilson

Series 3

The third series began airing in the UK on 11 October 2009.

The Killers, Florence and the Machine and Chairlift
Antony & the Johnsons, The Enemy, and Paloma Faith
The Gossip, The Mars Volta and Friendly Fires
Noisettes, Lyle Lovett and Doves
Mika, La Roux and Bloc Party
Fleet Foxes, PJ Harvey and John Parish and Manchester Orchestra
Seal, Imelda May and Sugarland
Counting Crows, Melody Gardot and Hockey
Yusuf Islam, The Fray and White Lies
Green Day, Bat For Lashes and Starsailor
Michael Bublé, The Temper Trap and Little Boots
A Tribute to the Beatles' Abbey Road album

Series 4

Began broadcast in the UK on Channel 4 in June 2011 and will continue until December 2011. It will then be broadcast around the rest of the world from January 2012.
Raphael Saadiq and Noah and the Whale
Blondie and Anna Calvi
Beady Eye and James Blake
Rumer and The Villagers
Kaiser Chiefs and Glasvegas
Brandon Flowers and Lykke Li
Laura Marling and Ryan Adams
The Pierces and Dark Dark Dark
Feist and Foster the People
The Kooks and Viva Brother
Gregg Allman and Ed Sheeran
Best Unseen Footage

Series 5
International broadcast from November 2012
 Jamiroquai, Foster the People, Kate Nash, Gipsy Kings, Dashboard Confessional 
 The Fratellis, Glasvegas, Matchbox 20, The Kills, Stereophonics, Primal Scream and Panic! at the Disco
 Feist, Antony & the Johnsons, Corinne Bailey Rae, Manu Chao, Gnarls Barkley and Wynton Marsalis
 Ray Lamontagne, Sara Bareilles, Nerina Pallot, Sheryl Crow and The Script
  Dave Matthews, Norah Jones, Suzanne Vega and Gregg Allman
 Alanis Morissette, LeAnn Rimes, Colbie Caillat, Shawn Colvin, Randy Crawford and Joe Sample
 Ryan Adams, Anna Calvi, Ben Harper, Amos Lee, Seal, Damien Rice
 Wynton Marsalis, Diana Krall, Madeleine Peyroux and Dr. John 
 Green Day, The Feeling, The Hoosiers, The Subways, Beady Eye and Massive Attack
 Red Hot Chili Peppers, White Lies, The Zutons, Hockey, The Mars Volta, Hard-Fi, The Good, the Bad & the Queen and Starsailor
 Gossip, Little Boots, James Blunt, Craig David, Villagers, James Morrison, Chairlift, Mary J Blige, Bryan Adams and John Mayer
 Ed Sheeran, Brian Wilson, Gnarls Barkley, Paul Simon and Michael Bublé

Abbey Road Studios: In Session
Broadcast on Channel 4 Oct-Nov 2012

 Paul Weller Live Concert
 The Maccabees, Django Django
 The Civil Wars, Kyle Eastwood
 The Vaccines, Jake Bugg
 Foals, alt-J
 First Aid Kit, Kristina Train
 Biffy Clyro, Two Door Cinema Club
 Best Unseen Footage

Live From Abbey Road CLASSICS
Broadcast on Channel 4 June–July 2015

References

External links 
 

British music television shows
2007 British television series debuts